Malcolm Sutherland was an English professional association footballer who played as an inside forward.

References

English footballers
Association football forwards
Burnley F.C. players
Darwen F.C. players
English Football League players
Year of death missing
Year of birth missing